Pixel Piracy is an indie side-scrolling real-time strategy video game with roguelike elements, developed by Quadro Delta. In the game, players construct a pirate ship, hire and train a crew, and guide their crew toward notoriety as renowned pirates.

Gameplay 
Pixel Piracy puts the player in control of a pirate captain. The game's goal is to defeat four notorious pirates, but players are free to adventure in the game as they wish. After customizing difficulty settings, the player's captain spawns on an island where the player can build their own ship using a set of blocks and hire a crew. While traveling, the player must control the crew's hunger and deal with equipment requirements. The captain can be killed by starvation or enemy pirates, or even by wild animals. The game has permadeath, so when the player's captain dies in the game the captain does not respawn.

To embark, the player can select a destination on the world map. Locations range in population and danger. The computer controls the actual sailing, but the ship will stop for a battle if its route crosses an occupied map node. Ship battles are determined by acquired stats and by choices the player can make. Winning battles grants the player points and equipment which they can use to upgrade the crew.

Upon reaching a destination, the inhabitants may be friendly or hostile toward the crew. Crew stats including health, morale, and supply level affect the success of pillaging at a destination.

Reception 
Back in its early access period, the game was praised for its potential. PC Gamer Craig Pearson wrote in January 2014 that the game had "a gorgeous art style and cute soundtrack" that contrasted with the difficulty of the gameplay. He noted the result of the 'plunder' function (which destroys defeated vessels) surprised him, as it killed his captain and crew while they were aboard an enemy ship. He also lamented that the map and fighting needed organizational improvements. Pearson concluded: "But those are me picking at scabs: it's charming and atmospheric, I've had plenty of fun fiddling with its systems, and it doesn't feel like it'll easily run out of challenges".

The game received a mixed reception upon release. On April 23, 2015, the development team issued a formal apology, acknowledging their failures and assuring players that much work had been and would continue to be done to meet all development promises and fix all of the game's issues.

Notes

References

External links 
 Official website

2015 video games
Action-adventure games
Early access video games
Linux games
MacOS games
Indie video games
PlayStation 4 games
Video games developed in Finland
Windows games
Video games using procedural generation
Video games about pirates
Xbox One games
Multiplayer and single-player video games